The Associação Empresarial de Portugal (AEP) (Portuguese Business Association) is a Portuguese chamber of commerce, based in Porto, Portugal and founded in 1849. Its first statutes, however, date from 1838.

In 1996, the Associação Empresarial de Portugal was officially upgraded to Chamber of Commerce and Industry of the Norte Region (decree no. 58/96 of 22 February).

See also 
Visionarium

External links 
Official site

Chambers of commerce
Business in Portugal
Organisations based in Porto
Organizations established in 1849
1849 establishments in Portugal